Daniil Yegorovich Sulimov (– 27 November 1937) was a Soviet-Russian statesman who was from 1930 to 1937 the Chairman of the Council of People's Commissars of the Russian SFSR, equivalent to Premier or Prime Minister.

He was arrested and executed during the Great Purge.

He was posthumously rehabilitated on 17 March 1956.

References

1890 births
1937 deaths
People from Ashinsky District
Old Bolsheviks
Politburo of the Central Committee of the Communist Party of the Soviet Union members
Russian communists
Heads of government of the Russian Soviet Federative Socialist Republic
Great Purge victims from Russia
People executed for treason against the Soviet Union
Members of the Communist Party of the Soviet Union executed by the Soviet Union
People's commissars and ministers of the Russian Soviet Federative Socialist Republic